"Cadillac Ranch" is a song written by Bruce Springsteen that was first released on Springsteen's 1980 album The River.  In 1981 it was released as a single in Europe, backed by "Be True" in France and by "Wreck on the Highway" in the UK.  Although it was not released as a single in the US, it did reach #48 on the Billboard Mainstream Rock Tracks chart. A favorite in concert, a live version was included on Live/1975–85.  A version was also included on the documentary film Blood Brothers.

Music and lyrics

"Cadillac Ranch" is an exuberant, playful rocker with rockabilly influences.  According to music critic Dave Marsh, it "made dinosaurs dance."  It is highlighted by Clarence Clemons' saxophone solo.  Author June Skinner Sawyers called the song "pure rowdy fun" and listed it as one of Springsteen's ten funniest songs.  John Cruz of Sputnik Music called the song "just plain fun," noting its infectious beat.  However, the theme of the song is "the transitoriness of all existence" and the inevitability of death.  Marsh called the song "one of the smartest songs ever about the inevitability of death".  Marsh further noted that although the protagonist of "Cadillac Ranch" seems similar to the protagonists of earlier Springsteen records, in this song he appears naive and vulnerable rather than bold and innocent.

The song's title comes from Cadillac Ranch in Amarillo, Texas.  Cadillac Ranch is a sculpture showing ten Cadillac automobiles with their hoods buried in the ground.  Springsteen used Cadillac Ranch as a metaphor for his theme; that these once elite cars are now expendable.

Among the real life people namechecked in the song are Burt Reynolds, Junior Johnson, and James Dean.

Personnel
According to authors Philippe Margotin and Jean-Michel Guesdon:

Bruce Springsteen – vocals, guitars
Roy Bittan – piano, backing vocals
Clarence Clemons – saxophone, backing vocals
Danny Federici – organ
Garry Tallent – bass
Steven Van Zandt – guitars, vocal harmonies, backing vocals
Max Weinberg – drums

Covers
Warren Zevon covered "Cadillac Ranch" during his 1982 tour and the song was featured in an MTV broadcast from the Capitol Theatre in Passaic, New Jersey on October 1, 1982. 

Status Quo originally recorded the song for their 1983 album Back to Back, but the song was cut and was later released on the 1999 album Back to the Beginning. 

The Nitty Gritty Dirt Band covered the song on their 1984 album Plain Dirt Fashion as well as the 1991 live album Live Two Five.

In 1986, Savoy Records (in the UK), released a 12" single, by Lord Horror, which was a cover of Blue Monday (by New Order), but with its lyrics replaced by the lyrics to "Cadillac Ranch" instead. The single didn't chart though, mainly because it wasn't stocked in many record shops, due to its controversial artwork. The track is also available on a Savoy Records compilation album, Savoy Wars, which was released in 1994.

Rick Trevino's version appears on the compilation albums NASCAR: Runnin' Wide Open (1995) and Highway Fever: All Time Greatest Country Road Songs (2006).

Daniel Johnston's song "Funeral Home" takes its melody from "Cadillac Ranch".

In 2023, country music artist Brett Kissel released a cover of "Cadillac Ranch" on his album The Compass Project - South Album''.

References

External links
 Lyrics & Audio clips from Brucespringsteen.net

1980 songs
1981 singles
Bruce Springsteen songs
Songs written by Bruce Springsteen
Song recordings produced by Jon Landau
Rockabilly songs
Nitty Gritty Dirt Band songs
Brett Kissel songs
Columbia Records singles
Songs about cars
Song recordings produced by Bruce Springsteen
Song recordings produced by Steven Van Zandt
Cadillac